Upper Welland is a small settled area within the civil parish of Malvern Wells, in Worcestershire, England. Lying close to the county boundaries of Herefordshire.It was formed when the upper part of Welland parish joined the newly created Malvern Hills Urban District. Welland Parish once stretched to the ridge of the Malvern Hills.

Villages in Worcestershire